Schizaphis is a genus of aphid in the family Aphididae superfamily Aphidoidea, order Hemiptera.
Its original distribution is the Palaearctic, but some species have been introduced to other parts of the world. There are about 40 recognized Schizaphis species worldwide.

References

External links

Aphidini
Agricultural pest insects
Insects described in 1852
Hemiptera genera